Exhibit A is the major label debut LP album from Tennessee-based band The Features. It was released on September 14, 2004 in the USA and April 18, 2005 in the UK.  The UK edition features alternative cover art and two bonus tracks "Kari-Ann" and "Darkroom."

Track listing
"Exhibit A" – 2:05
"The Way It's Meant to Be" – 2:07
"Me & the Skirts" – 2:30
"Blow It Out" – 3:00
"There's a Million Ways to Sing the Blues" – 2:17
"Leave It All Behind" – 2:28
"Exorcising Demons" – 3:21
"The Idea of Growing Old" – 3:12
"Some Way Some How" – 3:11
"Situation Gone Bad" – 2:43
"Harder to Ignore" – 2:24
"Circus – 3:20
UK bonus tracks
<li>"Kari-Ann" – 2:55
<li>"Dark Room" – 2:46

Personnel
Matt Pelham - vocals, guitar
Rollum Haas - drums
Roger Dabbs - bass
Parrish Yaw - keyboards

Written and Performed by The Features
Produced by Craig Krampf
Co-produced by Mike McCarthy and The Features
Recorded by Mike McCarthy at Sweet Tree Studios, Oxford, Mississippi
Recording Assisted by Sean Macke & Dawn Palmetto
Mixed by David Thoener at Blackbird Studios, Nashville, Tennessee
Mastered by George Marino at Sterling Sound, New York, NY
Art Direction by MR. SCOTT DESIGN
Photography by Piper Ferguson

References

External links
http://www.thefeatures.com 
http://www.universalrecords.com

2004 albums
The Features albums